The 1969 St. Louis Cardinals season was the team's 88th season in St. Louis, Missouri and its 78th season in the National League. The Cardinals went 87–75 during the season and finished fourth in the newly established National League East, 13 games behind the eventual NL pennant and World Series champion New York Mets.

The resurgent Chicago Cubs, featuring players such as Ernie Banks, Ron Santo, and Billy Williams and helmed by fiery manager Leo Durocher, led the newly formed NL East for much of the summer before faltering.  The Cardinals put on a mid-season surge, as their famous announcer Harry Caray (in what would prove to be his final season of 25 doing Cardinals broadcasts) began singing, "The Cardinals are coming, tra-la, tra-la".  However, to the surprise of both Chicago and St. Louis, the Miracle Mets would ultimately win the division, as well as the league championship and the World Series.

Offseason 
 October 14, 1968: Coco Laboy was drafted from the Cardinals by the Montreal Expos as the 54th pick in the 1968 MLB expansion draft.
 December 2, 1968: 1968 rule 5 draft
Pedro Borbón was drafted from the Cardinals by the California Angels.
Bo Belinsky was drafted by the Cardinals from the Houston Astros.
 February 12, 1969: Byron Browne was purchased by the Cardinals from the Houston Astros.
 March 17, 1969: Orlando Cepeda was traded by the Cardinals to the Atlanta Braves for Joe Torre.
 March 29, 1969: Dennis Ribant was purchased by the Cardinals from the Kansas City Royals.
 Prior to 1969 season: Tommy Cruz was signed by the Cardinals as an amateur free agent.

Regular season 
Pitcher Bob Gibson and outfielder Curt Flood won Gold Gloves this year.

1969 also marked the final season for the Busch Stadium grass before the installation of AstroTurf, which would be their home surface for the next 26 seasons.

After the season, long-time broadcaster Harry Caray's contract was not renewed. At a news conference shortly afterward, Caray pointedly and conspicuously drank from a can of Schlitz beer, at the time the main competitor to the brands of Anheuser-Busch (A–B), who owned the Cardinals. He said he did not know why he had been let go, but doubted the team's claim that the decision was made because he was hurting beer sales. Instead, he suspected that people believed rampant rumors that he had been having an affair with Susan Busch, daughter-in-law of team president and A–B CEO Gussie Busch.

Caray would be a broadcaster for the Oakland Athletics in 1970, before spending 27 seasons in Chicago with the White Sox (1971–1981) and the Cubs from 1982 until his death prior to the 1998 season.

Season standings

Record vs. opponents

Opening Day starters 
 Lou Brock
 Curt Flood
 Bob Gibson
 Julián Javier
 Dal Maxvill
 Tim McCarver
 Vada Pinson
 Mike Shannon
 Joe Torre

Notable transactions 
 April 3, 1969: Bo Belinsky was purchased from the Cardinals by the California Angels.
 May 22, 1969: John Sipin and Sonny Ruberto were traded by the Cardinals to the San Diego Padres for Bill Davis and Jerry DaVanon.
 June 5, 1969: Bill Madlock was drafted by the Cardinals in the 11th round of the 1969 Major League Baseball Draft, but did not sign.
 June 14, 1969: Dennis Ribant was traded by the Cardinals to the Cincinnati Reds for Aurelio Monteagudo.

Roster

Player stats

Batting

Starters by position 
Note: Pos = Position; G = Games played; AB = At bats; H = Hits; Avg. = Batting average; HR = Home runs; RBI = Runs batted in

Other batters 
Note: G = Games played; AB = At bats; H = Hits; Avg. = Batting average; HR = Home runs; RBI = Runs batted in

Pitching

Starting pitchers 
Note: G = Games pitched; IP = Innings pitched; W = Wins; L = Losses; ERA = Earned run average; SO = Strikeouts

Other pitchers 
Note: G = Games pitched; IP = Innings pitched; W = Wins; L = Losses; ERA = Earned run average; SO = Strikeouts

Relief pitchers 
Note: G = Games pitched; W = Wins; L = Losses; SV = Saves; ERA = Earned run average; SO = Strikeouts

Farm system

Notes

References

External links
1969 St. Louis Cardinals at Baseball Reference
1969 St. Louis Cardinals team page at www.baseball-almanac.com

St. Louis Cardinals seasons
Saint Louis Cardinals season
St Louis